Travis Cabral (born September 23, 1983) is an American freestyle skier. He competed in the men's moguls event at the 2006 Winter Olympics.

References

1983 births
Living people
American male freestyle skiers
Olympic freestyle skiers of the United States
Freestyle skiers at the 2006 Winter Olympics
People from South Lake Tahoe, California
Sportspeople from California